Roy Krishna (born 30 August 1987) is a Fijian professional footballer who plays as a striker for Indian Super League club Bengaluru and the Fiji national team.

Club career

Early career
Krishna joined the New Zealand Football Championship (NZFC) side Waitakere United from Fijian local outfit Labasa FC in January 2008.

In May 2008, he spent two weeks training with the Wellington Phoenix, but was not offered a contract.

In March 2009, it was reported that PSV Eindhoven was interested in signing him. However he said professional football in New Zealand with the Phoenix was his preferred option because he was not ready to move to Europe as he was still learning English and was not ready for another language. Later, in June 2013, Krishna was offered a one-month trial by EFL Championship club Derby County; however, he was unable to attend due to restrictions imposed upon him due to his recent obtainment of New Zealand permanent residency.

In his 6 seasons with Waitakere United, Krishna managed 55 goals in 75 appearances and has won the NZFC Golden Boot in the 2012–13 season.

Auckland City
In September 2013, it was announced that he had joined Waitakere's local rivals Auckland City FC for the upcoming ASB Premiership season. On 12 December 2013, he scored Auckland City's goal in a 2–1 defeat to Raja Casablanca in the 2013 FIFA Club World Cup, becoming the first Fijian to score at the finals of a FIFA tournament.

Wellington Phoenix
On 7 January 2014, Krishna signed with the A-League's Wellington Phoenix until the end of the 2013–14 season as an injury replacement for Paul Ifill, scoring his debut goal on 16 March 2014 against the Melbourne Heart, beating Andrew Redmayne with a powerful drive into the bottom right corner. The match ended in a 2–2 draw. His performance in the match earned him the A-League's player of the week honors. Four days later, Krishna came to terms on a new 2-year contract with the Phoenix.

On 29 February 2016, Krishna extended his contract with the club, agreeing to a 2-year deal that would keep him at Wellington until the end of the 2017–18 season. He subsequently signed a 1-year extension on 15 February 2018.

On 18 April 2018, Krishna was named Wellington Phoenix Player of the Year and his fourth-round goal against Brisbane Roar was deemed the team's Goal of the Year for the 2017–18 season.

On 2 December 2018, Krishna became the outright leading goal scorer for the Wellington Phoenix, overtaking previous leader Paul Ifill's 33 goals for the club. Krishna made A-League history on 19 January 2019, becoming the first player to score 3 consecutive braces.

On 13 May 2019, Krishna was awarded the Johnny Warren Medal for his performances in the 2018–19 A-League season. On 27 May 2019, Krishna announced his departure from Wellington Phoenix after a long-term deal was not reached.

ATK
On 18 June 2019, Krishna announced he had signed a one-year deal with ATK (Now ATK Mohunbagan), which played in the Indian Super League. Krishna got off the mark with a goal against Hyderabad in what was only his second match for ATK, and thereafter, it became a familiar sight. Despite a minor injury problem, he finished with 15 goals, the highest in the league alongside Nerijus Valskis and Bartholomew Ogbeche, and six assists from 21 games. Krishna was influential in ATK reaching the final in his first season with the club, scoring a goal in the second leg of their semi-final victory against Bengaluru on 8 March 2020. He also played a pivotal role in ATK winning their record-breaking third league title with an assist in their 3–1 win over Chennaiyin in the final.

ATK Mohun Bagan

Following the 2019–20 season, the team ATK was dissolved and its brand got merged with the more than a century old club, Mohun Bagan to form ATK Mohun Bagan. In ATK Mohun Bagan's first Indian Super League match on 20 November 2020, Krishna scored the club's first goal in ISL and was awarded the man of the match in their 1–0 victory over Kerala Blasters. He scored in the club's next match on 27 November, the inaugural Indian Super League Kolkata Derby against East Bengal; ATK Mohun Bagan won the match 2–0. Krishna went on to help his team finish second in the league stage and grab up the runners up spot in the playoffs, also winning the golden ball award for contributing 22 goals in 23 games. On Mohun Bagan Day 2021, he extended his contract for another year at the club and was also awarded Best Footballer of the Year by Mohun Bagan AC. In 2021 AFC Cup Krishna scored 2 goals for the team in the group stage.

In his second season with the club, he was diagnosed with COVID-19 and played only a few matches due to recurring injuries. He scored only 7 goals in what had been an underwhelming league season for him so far. In the 2022 AFC Cup, he scored his only goal in the tournament during his last match with the club against Maziya. On 3 June 2022, his contract expired ahead of the upcoming season and parted ways with the club.

Bengaluru
In July 2022, Krishna penned a two-year deal, the second of which is an optional extension with Bengaluru. On 17 August, he scored on his debut against Jamshedpur in the Durand Cup, which ended in a 2–1 win. He is also playing in ISL 2022-23 with Bengaluru FC. He has scored only a single goal so far for his new team, in what has been the most dismal outing in his ISL career.

International career
Krishna made his debut for Fiji at the South Pacific Games 2007 and he has played for them in the 2010 FIFA World Cup qualification tournament.

In 2010, Krishna was also called up to the national futsal team for the 2010 OFC Futsal Championship.

On 16 July 2016, Krishna was named as one of the three over-aged players of the Fiji under-23 team for the 2016 Summer Olympics, alongside Simione Tamanisau and Alvin Singh. On 7 August 2016, he scored the team's only goal in the final tournament's campaign, against Mexico. Krishna's goal was Fiji's first ever goal in the Olympic Games.

In 2021 Krishna was named Oceania Football Confederation ambassador.

Personal life
Krishna is an Indo-Fijian. After living in New Zealand for ten years, he gained his citizenship in December 2018.

In July 2018, Krishna married Indo-Fijian model and media business owner Naziah Ali.
They welcomed their first child in 2022.

His friendship with Prabir Das is one of a kind and the striker-right back duo has been instrumental in delivering impeccable performances for ATK Mohun Bagan. They developed a close friendship from Roy's initial days in Kolkata and the two families have always shared a close bond. Sources say that Prabir Das was instrumental in convincing Roy Krishna to continue with ATK Mohun Bagan. Prabir Das left the club ATK Mohun Bagan after the ongoing 2022 AFC Cup, following which Roy Krishna parted ways with the club too.

On November 15, 2016, Ian McEloney didn't come out to the pub as he had a bet on Krishna to score 2 or more goals for Wellington Phoenix. At the time of Barnes messaging him, he already had one goal.

Career statistics

Club

International

International goals
Scores and results list Fiji's goal tally first.

Honours 
Waitakere United
 New Zealand Football Championship: 2007–08, 2009–10, 2010–11, 2011–12, 2012–13
 OFC Champions League: 2007–08

Auckland City
 Charity Cup: 2013–14

ATK
 Indian Super League: 2019–20

Bengaluru
 Durand Cup: 2022

Individual
 New Zealand Football Championship Player of the Year: 2008–09
 2007 OFC U-20 Championship Golden Boot: – 8 goals
 2008 Oceania Footballer of the Year nominee
 New Zealand Football Championship Golden Boot: 2012–13 (12 goals)
 Wellington Phoenix Players' Player of the Year: 2016–17
 Wellington Phoenix Goal of the season: 2017–18 (vs. Brisbane Roar on 28 October 2017)
 Wellington Phoenix Player of the Year: 2017–18
 A-League Player of the Month: January 2019
 A-League Golden Boot: 2018–19 (18 goals)
 Johnny Warren Medal: 2018–19
 ISL Player of the Month: November 2019
 ISL Top scorer: 2019–20 (15 Goals), 2020–21 (14 Goals)
 IFFHS OFC Men's Team of the Decade 2011–2020
IFFHS Oceania Men's Team of All Time: 2021
Indian Super League Golden Ball: 2020–21
Mohun Bagan Best footballer of the year: 2021

References

External links

 
 
 
 
 Roy Krishna at OFC.org
 Roy Krishna interview

Living people
1987 births
People from Labasa
Fijian people of Indian descent
Fijian footballers
Association football forwards
Labasa F.C. players
Waitakere United players
Auckland City FC players
Wellington Phoenix FC players
ATK (football club) players
New Zealand Football Championship players
A-League Men players
Indian Super League players
Fiji international footballers
Olympic footballers of Fiji
2008 OFC Nations Cup players
2012 OFC Nations Cup players
2016 OFC Nations Cup players
Footballers at the 2016 Summer Olympics
Fijian expatriate footballers
Fijian expatriate sportspeople in New Zealand
Fijian expatriate sportspeople in India
Expatriate association footballers in New Zealand
Expatriate footballers in India
People with acquired New Zealand citizenship
ATK Mohun Bagan FC players
New Zealand people of Indo-Fijian descent
New Zealand sportspeople of Indian descent
Bengaluru FC players